Arnsdorf is a railway station in the town of Arnsdorf, Saxony, Germany. The station lies on the Görlitz–Dresden railway and Kamenz–Pirna railway. The section from Arnsdorf to Dürrröhrsdorf, which used to be part of Kamenz–Pirna railway, was closed in 2007.

Train services
The station is served by several local and regional services, which are operated by Vogtlandbahn and DB Regio Südost (as part of the Dresden S-Bahn).

References

External links
 
 Deutsche Bahn website

Railway stations in Saxony
station